Sex determination may refer to:

Development of an organism's sex 
 A sex-determination system, a biological system that directs the development of sexual characteristics in an organism
 Sex determination and differentiation (human)
 Sexual differentiation, the development of sexual characteristics in sexually reproducing organisms in general

Discernment of an organism's sex 

 Prenatal sex discernment, prenatal testing for the discernment of the fetal sex in humans
 Sex assignment, the discernment of an infant's sex at birth
 Sexing, used by biologists and agricultural workers to discern the sex of livestock or other animals

See also 

 Gender, including biological sex
 Sexual dimorphism, a phenotypic difference between males and females of the same species, used in sex discernment
 Sex differences in humans